Rhim (James Davis, born September 24, 1973) is a Toronto-based musician and sound designer/engineer best known as the former drummer for the band The Birthday Massacre since he joined in 2003. As a sound designer for the St. Catharine's based video game developer Silicon Knights, he worked on games including the Xbox 360 title Too Human.

In 2010, Rhim joined the band Fallon Bowman and the Grace Dynasty. The band played a series of live shows and announced their forthcoming debut album. Soon after the recording of the album, the decision was made for Fallon Bowman to drop the Grace Dynasty from the band's name and to continue it as solo project. The album, Human Conditional, was released on January 25, 2011.

Previously, he played and recorded with Toronto rock band Aphasia (now known as A Primitive Evolution) and Canadian singer/songwriter Mike Lynch. Also, he was a member of both the Niagara and Hamilton Youth Orchestras. 

Rhim endorses ddrum acoustic drums and Dream cymbals.

References

External links 
 Rhim's MySpace
 The Birthday Massacre on Facebook
 
 Fallon and The Grace Dynasty on MySpace

1973 births
Canadian rock drummers
Canadian male drummers
Living people
Musicians from Hamilton, Ontario
Musicians from Toronto
20th-century Canadian drummers
21st-century Canadian drummers
20th-century Canadian male musicians
21st-century Canadian male musicians